Sarego is a town and comune in the province of Vicenza, Veneto, north-eastern Italy. SP500 goes through the town of Sarego.

Main sights
In the frazione of Meledo, there are two incomplete villas designed by Andrea Palladio:
 Villa Trissino
 Villa Arnaldi

Sport
The local football club is A.C. M.M. Sarego A.S.D.

Sources 

 (Google Maps)
 Page at Comuni Italiani

Cities and towns in Veneto